Carneades nigrosignata is a species of beetle in the family Cerambycidae. It was described by Per Olof Christopher Aurivillius in 1926. It is known from Bolivia.

References

Colobotheini
Beetles described in 1926